Growing degree days (GDD), also called growing degree units (GDUs), are a heuristic tool in phenology. GDD are a measure of heat accumulation used by horticulturists, gardeners, and farmers to predict plant and animal development rates such as the date that a flower will bloom, an insect will emerge from dormancy, or a crop will reach maturity. GDD is credited to be first defined by Reaumur in 1735.

Introduction
In the absence of extreme conditions such as unseasonal drought or disease, plants grow in a cumulative stepwise manner which is strongly influenced by the ambient temperature. Growing degree days take aspects of local weather into account and allow gardeners to predict (or, in greenhouses, even to control) the plants' pace toward maturity.

Unless stressed by other environmental factors like moisture, the development rate from emergence to maturity for many plants depends upon the daily air temperature. Because many developmental events of plants and insects depend on the accumulation of specific quantities of heat, it is possible to predict when these events should occur during a growing season regardless of differences in temperatures from year to year. Growing degrees (GDs) is defined as the number of temperature degrees above a certain threshold base temperature, which varies among crop species. The base temperature is that temperature below which plant growth is zero. GDs are calculated each day as maximum temperature plus the minimum temperature divided by 2, minus the base temperature. GDUs are accumulated by adding each day's GDs contribution as the season progresses.

GDUs can be used to: assess the suitability of a region for production of a particular crop; estimate the growth-stages of crops, weeds or even life stages of insects; predict maturity and cutting dates of forage crops; predict best timing of fertilizer or pesticide application; estimate the heat stress on crops; plan spacing of planting dates to produce separate harvest dates. Crop specific indices that employ separate equations for the influence of the daily minimum (nighttime) and the maximum (daytime) temperatures on growth are called crop heat units (CHUs).

GDD calculation
GDD are calculated by taking the integral of warmth above a base temperature, Tbase (plant type dependant, see baseline section):

     (where integration is over the time period with ).

A simpler, approximately equivalent formulation uses the average of the daily maximum and minimum temperatures compared to a Tbase to calculate degree-days for a given day. As an equation:

If the minimum temperature Tmin is below the Tbase one, there exist two variants:

 variant A: Do not change . Only if , set . The resulting GDD is 0. This can be written more compactly as: 

 variant B: Change  to 

GDDs are typically measured from the winter low. Any temperature below Tbase is set to Tbase before calculating the average. Likewise, the maximum temperature is usually capped at 30 °C because most plants and insects do not grow any faster above that temperature. However, some warm temperate and tropical plants do have significant requirements for days above 30 °C to mature fruit or seeds.

Example of GDD calculation

For example, a day with a high of 23 °C and a low of 12 °C (and a base of 10 °C) would contribute 7.5 GDDs.

As a second example, a day with a high of 13 °C and a low of 5 °C (and a base of 10 °C) would contribute:

 version A: 0 GDD,)
 version B: 1.5 GDDs, as:

Plant development

Pest control
Insect development and growing degree days are also used by some farmers and horticulturalists to time their use of organic or biological pest control or other pest control methods so they are applying the procedure or treatment at the point that the pest is most vulnerable.  For example:
 Black cutworm larvae have grown large enough to start causing economic damage at 165 GDD
 Azalea lace bug emerges at about 130 GDD
 Boxwood leafminer emerges at about 250 GDD

Honeybees
Several beekeepers are now researching the correlation between growing degree-days and the life cycle of a honeybee colony.

Baselines
The optimal base temperature is often determined experimentally based on the life cycle of the plant or insect in question. Common baselines for crops are either 5 °C for cool-season plants and 10 °C for warm-season plants and most insect development.

Crops
 4.5 °C wheat, barley, rye, oats, flaxseed, lettuce, asparagus,"canning purposes"
 8 °C sunflower, potato
 10 °C maize (including sweet corn), sorghum, rice, soybeans, tomato, coffee, grapes, snap beans, lima beans
 30 °C the USDA measure heat zones in GDD above 30 °C; for many plants this is significant for seed maturation, e.g. reed (Phragmites) requires at least some days reaching this temperature to mature viable seeds

Pests
 6 °C Stalk borer
 7 °C Corn rootworm
 9 °C Alfalfa weevil
 10 °C  Black cutworm, European corn borer, standard baseline for insect and mite pests of woody plants
 11 °C Green cloverworm

Modified growing degree days
In the cases of some plants, not only do they require a certain minimum temperature to grow, but they will also stop growing above a warmer threshold temperature. In such cases, a modified growing degree day is used: the growing degree days are calculated at the lower baseline, then at the higher baseline, which is subtracted. Corn is an example of this: it starts growing at 10 °C and stops at 30 °C, meaning any growing degree-days above 30 °C do not count.

Units

GDDs may be calculated in either Celsius or Fahrenheit, though they must be converted appropriately; for every 9 GDDF there are 5 GDDC, or in conversion calculation:

GDDC = 5/9 * GDDF

The equivalent unit compliant with the International System of Units is the kelvin-second. A quantity of kelvin-seconds is four orders of magnitude higher than the corresponding degree day (1 Celsius degree-day is 8.64×104 K·s; 1 Fahrenheit degree-day is 4.8×104 K·s).

See also
Degree day
Growing season
Heating degree day
Weather derivative
Winkler scale
Phenology

References
 404 link

Notes

External links 
 Good explanation of Growing Degree Day calculations with examples
 Current year-to-date GDDs for selected US cities
 a table of GDDs necessary for grapes
 GDDs to various stages of maturity for selected crops
 University of Massachusetts Amherst Extension, Integrated Pest management Tools, web site accessed Jan 2005
 Online GDD calculator
 Turf Growing Degree Days Calculator for sports stadia and golf courses

Climatology
Horticulture
Agrometeorology
Pest control
Seasons
Meteorological indices